Bhoite Saranjam was one of the political saranjams of British India under the Bombay Presidency. Its capital was Jalgaon City. It was a Maratha jagir of the Bhoite clan.

The ruler was honoured by the titles such as Pargana Vatandar, Jagirdar and Inamdar rendered as Raja Inamdar Bahadur being Saranjamdar (Holder of Saranjam). The rulers have their root from Satara District Villages Viz. Tadawale, Wagholi, Hingangaon and Aradgaon. Current descendants ancestor Shrimant Sardar Tulajirao Bhoite Sarkar established Capital Jalgaon and built a fortress referred to as Bhoite Gadhi with his ancestors.

Bhoite Saranjams ruler was brother branches of Bhoite Sarnoubat and Senakartas of Satara and prominent among Maratha Politics.

This Saranjam was annexed on 1 November 1952.

See also
 Maratha
 Maratha Empire
 List of Maratha dynasties and states
 List of Indian princely states
 Saranjamdar

References

Bombay Presidency
Quasi-princely estates of India
States and territories disestablished in 1952
1952 disestablishments in India